Cédric Pemba-Marine, born 16 December 1983 in Hauts-de-Seine, is a French politician and mayor of Le Port-Marly in Yvelines, succeeding Marcelle Gorgues.

Biography 

Son of Rita Marine and grandson of Armand Marine, originally from Gros-Morne (Martinique), Cédric Pemba-Marine became involved in politics in the run up to the 2007 French presidential election. He became a municipal councillor in 2008, at the age of 24, and was entrusted with a sports delegation to carry out equipment projects and revitalise the sports policy in the commune of Port-Marly. He was then appointed deputy delegate for education and youth. A senior civil servant since 2010, he is a centre-ground politician, and a member of Democratic Movement (Modem). Parliamentary attaché to Bruno Millienne from 2017, he won the 2020 municipal elections, succeeding Marcelle Gorgues, who had decided not to stand for re-election after 16 years at the head of Port-Marly. Elected at 36, he is one of the youngest mayors in the department.

References 

Martiniquais people
Mayors of Yvelines
1983 births

Living people
People from Hauts-de-Seine
21st-century French politicians
Democratic Movement (France) politicians